Marc Vicent Tur Pico (born 30 November 1994) is a Spanish racewalker. In 2019, he competed in the men's 50 kilometres walk at the 2019 World Athletics Championships held in Doha, Qatar. He finished in 19th place.

In 2018, he competed in the men's 50 kilometres walk at the 2018 European Athletics Championships held in Berlin, Germany. He finished in 22nd place.

During the 2020 Summer Olympics in Tokyo, he placed 4th in the men's 50 kilometres walk.

Competition record

Personal life 
Tur is openly gay.

References

External links 

 
 
 
 

Living people
1994 births
Spanish male racewalkers
World Athletics Championships athletes for Spain
Athletes (track and field) at the 2020 Summer Olympics
Olympic athletes of Spain
Spanish LGBT sportspeople
LGBT track and field athletes